Sailing/Yachting is an Olympic sport that has been part of the Olympic programme starting from the Games of the 1st Olympiad (1896 Olympics in Athens, Greece). With the exception of 1904 and possibly the canceled 1916 Summer Olympics, sailing has always been included on the Olympic schedule. The Sailing program in 2004 consisted of eleven disciplines divided over nine sailing classes. For each discipline multiple races were scheduled between 14 and 28 August 2004 along the coast near Athens. Athens hosted the Olympic sailing competitions for the second time, having previously done so during the 1896 Summer Olympics. However, in 1896, the sailing competition was cancelled due to heavy storms and further bad weather conditions. This time the weather conditions were good. The sailing event was executed on the several types of Olympic courses in different course areas using the 'Fleetrace' and 'Matchrace' formats.

Venue 

According to the IOC statutes, the contests in all sport disciplines must be held either in, or as close as possible to the city which the IOC has chosen. Among others, an exception can be made for the Olympic sailing events. However the situation in Athens is very suitable for sailing. Therefore, the racing was organized at the Agios Kosmos Marina at the coastal area of Southern Attica some 14 km south of Athens city centre and close to the old airport. This harbor was built in the 1960s but for the 2004 Summer Games it was completely reconstructed to form the Agios Kosmas Olympic Sailing Centre. The Agios Kosmas Olympic Sailing Centre was completed on 31 January 2004. On clear day the Acropolis could be seen from the course areas.

Competition

Overview

Continents 
 Africa
 Asia
 Europe
 North America
 Oceania
 South America

Countries 
During the 2004 Summer Olympics sixty one countries competed in the Olympic sailing regattas. Australia, France, Italy, Great Britain, Greece, Spain and the USA were each present in all classes with a total of eighteen sailors (7 women and 11 men) per country.

Classes (equipment)

Race schedule

Medal summary

Women's events

Men's events

Open events

Medal table

Further reading

References

External links
Official result book – Sailing

 
2004 Summer Olympics events
2004
2004 in sailing
Elliniko-Argyroupoli
Sailing competitions in Greece